Corcyre (archaic French for "Corfu") was one of three short-lived French departments of Greece.

History
It came into existence after Napoleon's conquest in 1797 of the Republic of Venice, when Venetian Greek possessions such as the Ionian islands fell to the French Directory. It consisted of the islands of Kerkyra (Corfu) and Paxoi, as well as the cities of Butrint and Parga on the adjacent mainland. Its prefecture was in the City of Corfu. The island was lost to Russia after the Siege of Corfu (1798–1799) and the department was officially disbanded in 1802. Also, Butrint was captured in 1798 by Ali Pasha, ruler of the Pashalik of Yanina. 

During the renewed French control in 1807–1814, the department was not re-established, the constitutional form of the former Septinsular Republic being kept.

Administration

Commissioners
The Commissioner of the Directory was the highest state representative in the department.

See also 
 Department of Mer-Égée
 Department of Ithaque
 French rule in the Ionian Islands (1797–1799)
 Treaty of Campo Formio

References 
 
 
 

Former departments of France in Greece
States and territories established in 1797
History of Corfu
1797 establishments in France
States and territories disestablished in 1799